The  is a local newspaper based in Okinawa Prefecture, Japan. The company has its registered headquarters in Naha. The newspaper is one of the two major dailies in Okinawa, the other being Ryukyu Shimpo.

In 2015 the editor in chief was Kazuhiko Taketomi.

See also 

 Media of Japan

References

External links

 Official website (in Japanese)
 Okinawa Times English News (in English)

1948 establishments in Japan
Asahi Shimbun Company
Companies based in Okinawa Prefecture
Mass media in Okinawa Prefecture
Daily newspapers published in Japan
Publications established in 1948